Ivy League Records is a record label based in Sydney, Australia.

History
Ivy League Records is an Australian-based record label established in 1997 by three ex-musician friends: Pete Lusty (John Reed Club) (RIP), Andy Cassell (Youth Group) and Andy Kelly (Glide), who also founded Winterman & Goldstein Management. Ivy League albums have won the prestigious Australian Music Prize (AMP Award) twice via The Mess Hall and Cloud Control. The label has achieved gold/platinum albums via The Rubens, Josh Pyke and Lanie Lane. Other artists on the label include Alpine, Hatchie, The Teskey Brothers, Rolling Blackouts Coastal Fever, Tiny Little Houses, Bad Dreems, Sparkadia, Youth Group, 78 Saab, The City Lights, The Vines, Hoolahan.

Rise to prominence
Ivy League experienced its first significant success with the Sydney band, Youth Group. Ivy League subsequently reached prominence through the label with Josh Pyke and Cloud Control; management success was experienced with The Vines, Jet and The Sleepy Jackson.

Equity deal
In March 2006, Ivy League announced that they had entered into an equity relationship with Michael Gudinski, a well-known figure in the Australian music scene.

Past releases
In the past, the label released music from the likes of The Vines, Red Riders, Bridezilla, Wild Billy Childish and the Buff Medways, The Silents, 78 Saab, The City Lights, The Whigs, Snob Scrilla and Neon and The John Reed Club.

Distribution
Ivy League is distributed by Universal Music Australia.

Bands (Current)

A. Swayze & the Ghosts
Hatchie
The Mess Hall
Rolling Blackouts Coastal Fever
The Rubens
The Teskey Brothers
Tiny Little Houses
Wilsn
Youth Group

Bands (Alumni)
Alpine
Bad Dreems
Cabins
Catcall
Cloud Control
Deep Sea Arcade
The Vines
Red Riders
78 Saab
The City Lights
The Silents
Neon
Bridezilla
Snob Scrilla
Sparkadia
Lanie Lane
Wons Phreely
Hoolahan
 John Reed Club

Awards and nominations

AIR Awards
The Australian Independent Record Awards (commonly known informally as AIR Awards) is an annual awards night to recognise, promote and celebrate the success of Australia's Independent Music sector.

! 
|-
| 2022
| Ivy League Records
| Independent Label of the Year
| 
|

See also
 List of record labels

References

External links
 
 Ivy League Records' official Facebook page
 

Australian record labels
Alternative rock record labels
Rock record labels
Record labels based in Sydney